Khorram Bak (also known as Khorram Beya, Khorram Beyg, Khorram Beyk, and Khorramak) is a village in Mazul Rural District, in the Central District of Nishapur County, Razavi Khorasan Province, Iran. At the 2006 census, its population was 694, in 173 families.

References 

Populated places in Nishapur County